Acadian French is a variety of French spoken by Acadians, mostly in the region of Acadia, Canada. Acadian French has 7 regional accents, including chiac and brayon.

Phonology
Since there was relatively little linguistic contact with France from the late 18th century to the 20th century, Acadian French retained features that died out during the French standardization efforts of the 19th century such as these:

According to Wiesmath (2006), some characteristics of Acadian are:
The verbal ending -ont in the third person plural
A featured called  where  is pronounced 
These features typically occur in the speech of older people.

Many aspects of Acadian French (vocabulary and "trill r", etc.) are still common in rural areas in the South West of France. Speakers of Metropolitan French and even of other Canadian varieties of French sometimes have difficulty understanding Acadian French. Within North America, its closest relative is the Cajun French spoken in Southern Louisiana since both were born out of the same population that were affected during the Expulsion of the Acadians.

See also Chiac, a variety with strong English influence, and St. Marys Bay French, a distinct variety of Acadian French spoken around Clare, Tusket, Nova Scotia and also Moncton, New Brunswick.

Palatalization
not to be confused with affrication typical of Quebec French.
  and  often become  (sometimes ) before a front vowel. (This pronunciation led to the word Cajun, from Acadien.)

Metathesis
Metathesis is quite common.

In words, "re" is often pronounced "er". For instance :
  for "",  for "",  for "",  for "",  for "".

Vowels
 The ⟨oi⟩ spelling has different pronunciations. Old speakers pronounce it , because the traditional Parisian pronunciation was like this:  ('king') . But in modern standard Acadian French, it is pronounced .

Elision of final consonants

Vocabulary and grammar

Yves Cormier's  (ComiersAcad) includes the majority of Acadian regionalisms. Acadian still differentiates the  form from the  form.

The following words and expressions are most commonly restricted to Acadian French south of the Miramichi River, but some are also used north of the Miramichi River and in Quebec French (also known as Québécois) or Joual for the Montreal version of Quebec French. The Miramichi line is an isogloss separating South Acadian (archaic or “true” Acadian) from the Canadian French dialects to the north, North Acadian, Brayon (Madawaskan) and Quebec French (Laurentian French). South Acadian typically has morphosyntactic features such as [je [V [-on] … ]] (as in je parlons “we speak”) that distinguishes it from dialects to the north or elsewhere in the Americas such as Cajun French, Saint-Barthélemy French or Métis French that have [nouzot [on- [V …]]] (as in nous-autres on parle). Geddes (1908), the oldest authority on any variety of French spoken in Northern Acadia, records of the morphosyntactic characteristics of “true” Acadian spoken in the South and adjacent islands to the West.

Some examples of "true" Acadian French are:

 : 'to bother' (very common in Quebec French)
 : 'thing, thingy, also the way things join together: the joint or union of two things'
 : (literally, 'to moor') 'to tie'
 : (lit. 'lover') 'burdock' (also very common in Quebec French)
 : (contraction of ) 'now' (very common in Quebec French)
 : 'to lean'
 : 'earlier'
 : 'to have difficulty' (very common in Quebec French)
 : 'to give' (Usually 'to yawn')
 : 'a piece of machinery or tool of sorts that no longer works properly', e.g. "My car is a lemon so it is a " (very common in New Brunswick)
 : 'the central passage through a barn flanked by two storage bays adjacent to the eaves'.
 : 'twin'
 : 'to confuse, disrupt, unsettle'
 : 'a fearful character of fairy tales who would visit unpleasant deeds upon young children if they did not go to bed at the designated hour'.
 : (literally 'the side of a ship')  meaning 'the other side (of a street, river, etc.');  meaning 'changing sides (in a team competition)';  meaning 'turning back or retracing one's steps'.
 : 'smoke, steam' (very common in Quebec French)
 : 'fence'
 : 'to cry, weep' (very common in Quebec French)
 : 'work shoe, old or used shoe'
 : 'drinking binge' (common in Quebec French)
 : 'to sink' (also 'to drink fast in one shot') (very common in Quebec French)
 : 'car' (very common in Quebec French)
 : 'window'
 : 'to go crazy'
 : 'I am' (Fr: , or, colloquially ) (very common in Quebec French)
 : 'peas, green beans'
 : 'what, or asking for information specifying something'.
 : 'to cheat'
 : 'ship's knees' that are a distinctive and unusual structural feature of early Acadian houses.
 : 'Devil'
 : 'proper, properly'
 : (literally 'a ship's ladder') 'stairway'
 : 'I' 
 : 'moment, while'
 : 'and I'
 : 'to wait; say welcome, to invite'
 : 'to gross out'
 : 'loose, wild, of easy virtue'
 : (lit. 'furnace') 'a wood stove, oven'
 : 'cold' (very common in Quebec French)
 : 'traditional Acadian stew prepared with chicken, potatoes, onions, carrots, dumplings (lumps of dough), and seasoned with savoury'
 : 'to throw, chuck' (very common in Quebec French)
 : 'spring cleaning', often more comprehensive than in other cultures.
 : (literally, 'rigging of a ship's masts') 'to describe a woman's attire or decoration of a youngster's bicycle'.
 : 'a sleeping loft'.
 : 'clothes, clothing'
 : 'to beat, maltreat'
 : 'to cry out, scream'
 : 'precisely here'
 : 'here; around here'
 : 'simple, foolish or stupid' (very common in Quebec French)
 : 'also, too' (common in Quebec French)
 : (literally 'loosening a ship's mooring lines') 'to let go of any object'
 : 'to overwork, wear out, tire, weaken' (very common in Quebec French)
 : 'when' + future tense
malin/maline: 'mean or angry' (lit. malignant)
: 'to be irritated or angry'
 : 'middle, centre'
 : 'moose'
 : (lit. 'pagan') 'hick, uneducated person, peasant'
 : 'clumsy'
 : 'park'
 : 'a shepherd's pie casserole of mashed potatoes, ground meat, and corn'. 
 : 'bad odor'
 : 'at worst'
 : 'plaice'
 : 'having or showing determined courage' (lit. 'plucky')
 : 'buckwheat pancake', a tradition of Edmundston, New Brunswick, also common in Acadian communities in Maine
 : 'not', or a similar term of negation
 : (lit. 'meadow apple') American cranberry (Vaccinium macrocarpon)
 : 'a meat pie of venison, rabbits, and game birds'.
 : 'a ball made of grated potato with pork in the centre', a traditional Acadian dish
 : 'a portable wheeled boating pier pulled out of the water to avoid ice damage'.
 : (from ) 'to fetch, go get'
 : 'just' 
 : (lit. 'to haul oneself') 'to hurry'
 : 'to argue'
 : 'see you later'
 : 'we were'
 : 'they were'
 : 'Mikmaq woman, traditionally associated with medicine or Midewiwin'
 : 'a few' (Fr:  
 : 'ostrich fern fiddlehead' (Matteuccia struthiopteris)
 : (lit. 'mouse tit') 'slender glasswort, an edible green plant that grows in salt marshes' (Salicornia europaea)
 : 'din' (also refers to an Acadian noisemaking tradition whereby people gather in the streets and parade through town)
 : 'meat pies', sometimes with potatoes.
 : 'in disorder or confusion'
 : 'active, hard-working, brave' (common in Quebec French)

Numerals

See also 
Occitan language
Louisiana French, also known informally as Cajun French
Creole language
Chiac

Notes

References
 Le Glossaire acadien by Pascal Poirier French language page.

External links

 Acadian English Wordlist from Webster's Online Dictionary - The Rosetta Edition
Les Éditions de la Piquine Online Acadian Glossary with audio  - (Website is only in French)

Acadian culture
Acadian French
Canadian French
French language in the United States